Uel may refer to:

People
Uel (biblical figure), a minor biblical figure mentioned in the Book of Ezra
Uel Eubanks (1903–1954), baseball pitcher, briefly with the Chicago Cubs
Uel Graham (born 1967), Irish former cricketer
Uel Key, pseudonym of British author Samuel Whittell Key (1874–1948)
Uel W. Lamkin (1877–1956), president of Northwest Missouri State University

Places
Uel Siktyakh, a river in Yakutia, Russia

See also
UEL (disambiguation)